Aaron Kozak (born August 23, 1983) is an American playwright and filmmaker.

Early life
Kozak was born in Nacogdoches, Texas. After graduating from Grapevine High School, he went on to study theater at the University of Oklahoma (OU), where he earned a B.F.A. in Drama.

Career
Kozak's inaugural play "Goodbye, Love. Goodbye, Joy. Hello, Travis McElroy" debuted to mixed reviews at Washington DC's Capital Fringe Festival in 2009. However, it was Kozak's sophomore drama "The Birthday Boys," which earned him international acclaim. The play dramatizes a Prisoner of War situation during the Iraq War, where three marines are bound and blindfolded for almost the entire play. In the 2010 world premiere run at the first annual Hollywood Fringe Festival, "The Birthday Boys" earned five major award nominations, including Best of the Festival, and won both the LA Fringe Critic's Choice Award and the Fringe First Award for Best World Premiere. In 2011, "The Birthday Boys" debuted off-Broadway to rave reviews, and became the first live theatre performed since the Vaudeville era at the historic Texas Theatre in Dallas. The run was listed as Dallas' top touring show of 2011, alongside the Broadway Tour of Billy Elliot the Musical. "The Birthday Boys" made its international debut at the National Institute of Dramatic Art in Sydney, Australia.

In 2012, Kozak joined the Los Angeles-based theatre company Theatre Unleashed as a resident artist, and his latest play, a western epic called "Round Rock", debuted to sold-out runs at the 2012 Fringe Festival and also earned another nomination for the Fringe First Award.

"The Birthday Boys," "Goodbye, Love. Goodbye, Joy. Hello, Travis McElroy," and Kozak's short play compilation "Short Plays for Sad People" are set to be published in 2013.

Plays
 Birds and Bees of the Information Age (2013)
 The Pumpkin and Penguin Dialogues (2013)
 Love at First Fight (2013)
 Steers and Queers (2013)
 Bonkers (2013)
 Surrender Dorothy (2013)
 The Oak and The Reeds (2013)
 Round Rock (2012)
 The Birthday Boys (2010)
 Goodbye, Love. Goodbye, Joy. Hello, Travis McElroy. (2009)

Filmography
 The Show Businessman (2009)
 Basketball Shorts (2008)
 The Night Audit (2004)

References

External links
 Aaron Kozak on IMDB
 Goodbye Love, Goodbye Joy, Hello Travis McElroy Review by Steven McKnight
  Huffington Post Review of Kozak's The Birthday Boys
  Theatre Jones Review of Kozak's The Birthday Boys
  CriticalRant.com Year in Review 2011, Top Touring Show of 2011 Listing for "The Birthday Boys"
  AustralianStage.com.au article on "The Birthday Boys"
  BitterLemons.com Theatre Unleashed article

1983 births
21st-century American dramatists and playwrights
American film directors
American male screenwriters
University of Oklahoma alumni
Living people
American male dramatists and playwrights
21st-century American male writers
Screenwriters from Texas
21st-century American screenwriters